The List of Vrienden van het Platteland contains riders from the Vrienden van het Platteland team which have had the name Ondernemers van Nature-Vrienden van het Platteland in 2004.

2008 Vrienden van het Platteland

Ages as of 1 January 2008. 

Sources

Guest riders
The team had Felicia Gomez and Linn Torp as guest riders during the Tour of New Zealand and Gomez also during the Geelong Tour.

2007 Vrienden van het Platteland

Ages as of 1 January 2007.

Sources

2006 Vrienden van het Platteland

Ages as of 1 January 2006.

Sources

2005 Vrienden van het Platteland

Ages as of 1 January 2005.

2004 Ondernemers van Nature-Vrienden van het Platteland
Ages as of 1 January 2004.

Sources

Multiple years in the team

See also

Vrienden van het Platteland

References

Vrienden van het Platteland
Vrienden van het Platteland